Lieutenant-General Lionel Protip "Bogey" Sen DSO (20 October 1910 – 17 September 1981) was a decorated Indian Army general. He served as the Chief of the General Staff during 1959–1961 and commanded the Eastern Command during 1961–1963. He was the general responsible for countering the Chinese invasion of NEFA during the Sino-Indian War of 1962. Sen is also the author of Slender was the Thread, a military history of the Indo-Pakistani War of 1947–1948.

Career

Early career
A King's Commissioned Indian Officer (KCIO), Sen attended the Royal Military Academy Sandhurst and was commissioned a second lieutenant in the British Indian Army on 27 August 1931. As was customary, he was attached to a battalion of a regular British Army regiment, the 1st battalion of the Cheshire Regiment, for a period of one year prior to his official appointment to the Indian Army. He was formally appointed to the Indian Army as an officer with the 10th Baluch Regiment on 26 October 1932 (seniority from 29 January 1931). He was promoted lieutenant on 29 April 1933, and to captain on 29 January 1939.

Second world war
During the Second World War, Sen fought in the Burma Campaign with the 16th Battalion of 10 Baluch. In early 1945, his battalion took a prominent role in the Battle of Hill 170, during which he was awarded the Distinguished Service Order (DSO). The citation recommending Sen for the DSO (which was not published) noted:

...In spite of the greatest difficulties Lt-Col Sen held firmly on to his precarious positions, and the final success of the whole operation was in no small measure due to his dashing assault and tenacious defence. Throughout, he has proved himself a gallant leader of a gallant Battalion and an inspiration to every officer and man under his command.

Post-Independence
As the Baluch Regiment, Sen's parent regiment, was among those regiments allotted to Pakistan following Indian independence, Sen transferred to the 8th Gorkha Rifles. During the Indo-Pakistani War of 1947–1948, he was promoted to acting brigadier and commanded the 161st Indian Infantry Brigade, receiving a mention in dispatches. On 23 December 1949, he became Colonel of the 1st Gorkha Rifles (The Malaun Regiment).

On 16 March 1955, Sen was promoted acting major-general and appointed Director of Military Training (DMT). He was appointed Master-General of the Ordnance (MGO) on 8 May 1957, and was further appointed Colonel-Commandant of the Army Physical Training Corps on 26 September.

Sen was promoted to acting lieutenant-general on 1 August 1958, and to the substantive rank on 29 January 1959. On 8 May 1961, he was appointed GOC-in-C, Eastern Command, in which capacity he served during the Sino-Indian War the following year. After the conflict, Sen was appointed GOC-in-C, Southern Command, on 10 May 1963. He retired from this posting on 8 May 1965, after nearly 34 years of service.

Personal life
In 1939, he married Kalyani Gupta. Their first daughter, Radha, was born in 1941, and  Mala in 1947. The marriage ended in divorce in 1953. 

Sen died in 1981.

Awards and decorations

Dates of rank

Notes

References

1910 births
1981 deaths
British Indian Army officers
Companions of the Distinguished Service Order
Indian Army personnel of World War II
People of the Indo-Pakistani War of 1947
People of the Sino-Indian War
Indian generals
Indian Army personnel
Graduates of the Royal Military Academy Sandhurst
Indian Companions of the Distinguished Service Order